Robert Frylinck (born 27 September 1984) is a South African professional cricketer who played three Twenty20 International matches for the South African national cricket team between 2017 and 2018 and currently plays for the Dolphins.

Domestic career

He played domestic cricket for KwaZulu-Natal in South Africa until 2008, when he then moved to the Highveld Lions, then moving back to the Dolphins in 2011, and the hard-hitting all-rounder is seen by some as a natural successor to South African legend Lance Klusener.

Regarded as a late developer, he was not selected by Natal Schools at age group level, but his performances in South African club cricket drew the attention of KwaZulu-Natal's academy. Frylink made his List A debut for KwaZulu-Natal on 10 October 2004 in a UCB Provincial Shield match against Easterns.

Frylinck made his first-class debut on 13 October 2005 in the South African Airways Provincial Three-Day Challenge match against Western Province, taking impressive figures of 6–94 in 20 overs. In the same season he made his debut in the SuperSport Series for the Nashua Dolphins (which is the name used by KwaZulu-Natal in that competition).

Frylinck was a member of the South African National Academy Squad in 2006.

After appearing for Kwazulu-Natal/Dolphins in 16 first-class matches, Frylinck was not included among their contracted players for the 2008/2009 season.

Frylinck has extensive experience of league cricket in England. In 2007, he played in one match for Nelson Cricket Club in the Lancashire League and in 16 matches for Vauxhall Mallards in the East Anglian Premier Cricket League. In 2008, he played in 20 matches for Benwell Hill Cricket Club in the Northern Rock ECB North East Premier League.

On 10 June 2008, he made his debut for Surrey's second team in the Second Eleven Championship match away to Worcestershire, achieving bowling figures of 5–130 in the match, which Surrey won by 8 wickets. Subsequently, Frylinck made three appearances in the Second Eleven Trophy, a one-day competition. In these three matches, he took 7 wickets for 92 runs.

Having impressed Surrey's head coach, Alan Butcher, with his performances for the second team and his ability to bowl yorkers, slower balls and bouncers, Frylinck made his first team debut for Surrey on 17 August 2008 against Northants Steelbacks in the Pro40 league, taking 3–52.

Frylinck did not appear again for the Surrey first team in the 2008 season, but he made one further appearance in the Second Eleven Championship against Lancashire.

In October 2016, during the 2016–17 Sunfoil Series, Frylinck set a new South African franchise record for the best bowling figures in a match with 14 for 62.

T20 franchise cricket
In August 2017, he was named in Pretoria Mavericks' squad for the first season of the T20 Global League. However, in October 2017, Cricket South Africa initially postponed the tournament until November 2018, with it being cancelled soon after.

In December 2017, he took a hat-trick in the 2017–18 Ram Slam T20 Challenge.

In October 2018, he was named in Tshwane Spartans' squad for the first edition of the Mzansi Super League T20 tournament. Later the same month, he was named in the squad for the Chittagong Vikings team, following the draft for the 2018–19 Bangladesh Premier League.

In July 2019, he was selected to play for the Dublin Chiefs in the inaugural edition of the Euro T20 Slam cricket tournament. However, the following month the tournament was cancelled. In November 2019, he was selected to play for the Khulna Tigers in the 2019–20 Bangladesh Premier League. He took 20 wickets in 2019-20 Bangladesh Premier League playing for Khulna Tigers.

International career
In October 2017, he was named in South Africa's Twenty20 International (T20I) squad for their series against Bangladesh. He made his T20I debut for South Africa against Bangladesh on 26 October 2017. Shakib Al Hasan was his first wicket in international cricket.

References

External links

1987 births
Living people
South African cricketers
South Africa Twenty20 International cricketers
Dolphins cricketers
KwaZulu-Natal cricketers
Surrey cricketers
Delhi Capitals cricketers
Chattogram Challengers cricketers
Tshwane Spartans cricketers